Luke Brittain Jacobson (born 20 April 1997) is a New Zealand rugby union player who plays for the  in the Super Rugby competition, and for the All Blacks.  His plays in the forward pack.

Jacobson made the New Zealand Schools team in 2014. He played for the New Zealand Under 20 team in 2016 and (as captain) in 2017.  He made his Super Rugby debut in 2018.

Jacobson made his All Blacks debut in July 2019, in the final quarter of a narrow 20–16 win against Argentina. Following his second test, which was a 92–7 win over Tonga, Jacobson was named in New Zealand's squad for the 2019 Rugby World Cup, despite having around only 50 minutes' worth of international rugby. Jacobson did not play in the World Cup however, as he experienced a delayed onset of concussion symptoms. Shannon Frizell was called up as Jacobson's injury cover. Jacobson was named in the 2021 All Blacks squad.

References

External links 
 

New Zealand rugby union players
1997 births
Living people
Chiefs (rugby union) players
Rugby union flankers
Rugby union number eights
Sportspeople from Cambridge, New Zealand
People educated at Cambridge High School, New Zealand
New Zealand international rugby union players
Waikato rugby union players
Rugby union players from Waikato